Strikeforce: Shamrock vs. Gracie was the inaugural mixed martial arts event promoted by Strikeforce. The event took place at the HP Pavilion at San Jose in San Jose, California on March 10, 2006. The main event was the long awaited match between Frank Shamrock, returning to the sport after a 3-year absence, and Cesar Gracie.  The show is also notable for featuring the MMA debut of Cung Le.

Results

See also
 Strikeforce
 List of Strikeforce champions
 List of Strikeforce events
 2006 in Strikeforce

References

External links
Strikeforce Official website

Shamrock vs. Gracie
2006 in mixed martial arts
Events in San Jose, California
Mixed martial arts in San Jose, California
2006 in sports in California